There are over 20,000 Grade II* listed buildings in England. This article comprises a list of these buildings in the county of Shropshire Council.

List

|}

See also
Grade I listed buildings in Shropshire

References

External links

Lists of Grade II* listed buildings in Shropshire